Édouard Teisseire (27 August 1902 – 28 April 1981) was a French racing cyclist. He rode in the 1925 Tour de France.

References

1902 births
1981 deaths
French male cyclists
Place of birth missing